August Maturo (born August 28, 2007) is an American child actor. He is  best-known for his performance as Auggie Matthews on the Disney Channel sitcom Girl Meets World and his recurring role as the voice of Puck McSnorter in Mickey and the Roadster Racers. His notable film credits include the horror-thriller films The Nun (2018) and Slapface (2021).

Early life 
Maturo was born and raised in Ventura, California, where he began acting professionally at the age of 4. He began attending college in 2022 at age 14. He is of Italian and Jordanian descent.

Career 

From 2014 to 2017, Maturo starred in the Disney Channel sitcom Girl Meets World as Auggie Matthews, the younger brother of the titular character. 

In 2018, Maturo portrayed Daniel, in The Nun, a spin-off/prequel of 2016's The Conjuring 2.

In 2019, Maturo traveled to Budapest to film Shepherd: The Story of a Jewish Dog.  In the film, Maturo is separated from his family during World War II and reunited with his German Shepherd who has been adopted by a Nazi SS officer at a war camp where Joshua has been taken. The movie is based on the bestselling Israeli novel "The Jewish Dog" by Asher Kravitz and has had a limited festival release starting in 2021.

In 2020, Maturo completed feature film Slapface and Short Film Boys. In Slapface, the feature-length adaptation of Jeremiah Kipp's 2017 short film of the same name, Maturo portrays Lucas, the lead in the horror-thriller and won Best Actor at Grimmfest 2021 for his role in the film. The short film Boys starring Maturo premiered at LA Shorts and has screened at many other festivals in 2021. Directed by Luke Benward, Boys has qualified to be considered for a 2022 Academy Award in the live action short category.

In 2022, Maturo executive produces a VR docu-drama feature Just Like You – Food Allergies.

Personal life 
Maturo is an advocate for food allergy awareness, after experiencing potentially-fatal anaphylaxis while on the set of Girl Meets World when he was six years old.

Filmography

Film

Television

Music video

Awards and nominations

References

External links 
 August's Official Site
 

2007 births
21st-century American male actors
Actors from California
American film actors
American male child actors
American television actors
Living people
People from Ventura, California
American people of Jordanian descent